The Mediterranean, Southern or Miller's water shrew (Neomys milleri) is a species of insectivoran mammal in the family Soricidae.

Distribution

The shrew is found in Albania, Austria, Belgium, Bosnia and Herzegovina, Bulgaria, Croatia, Czech Republic, France, Germany, Greece, Hungary, Iran, Italy, Liechtenstein, Lithuania, Montenegro, North Macedonia, Poland, Romania, Serbia, Slovakia, Slovenia, Switzerland, Turkey, and Ukraine. This species was formerly a subspecies of Neomys anomalus along with the Iberian water shrew found in ''Spain, Portugal and southern France.

Feeding habits

It feeds mainly on amphibians and small fish, but also take insects and worms.  Because of its small size and thus higher surface area to volume ratio, it loses body heat more quickly and must eat two or three times its body mass each day.

References

Neomys
Mammals described in 1907
Taxonomy articles created by Polbot